The Sigma DP2x is a large-sensor digital compact camera announced by Sigma Corporation on February 8, 2011.  It features a Foveon X3 sensor.

Software 
Sigma Photo Pro provides processing of raw X3F files to JPEG for all digital SIGMA cameras. Version 6.x is a free download for Windows 7+ and Mac OS ab Version 10.7 (6.3.x). As of 2017, versions are 6.5.4 (Win 7+) and 6.5.5 (MacOSX 10.9+).

References

DP2x
Cameras introduced in 2011